Harold may refer to:

People 
 Harold (given name), including a list of persons and fictional characters with the name
 Harold (surname), surname in the English language
 András Arató, known in meme culture as "Hide the Pain Harold"

Arts and entertainment 
 Harold (film), a 2008 comedy film 
 Harold, an 1876 poem by Alfred, Lord Tennyson
 Harold, the Last of the Saxons, an 1848 book by Edward Bulwer-Lytton, 1st Baron Lytton
 Harold or the Norman Conquest, an opera by Frederic Cowen
 Harold, an 1885 opera by Eduard Nápravník
 Harold, a character from the cartoon The Grim Adventures of Billy & Mandy
Harold & Kumar, a US movie; Harold/Harry is the main actor in the show.

Places 
In the United States
 Alpine, Los Angeles County, California, an erstwhile settlement that was also known as Harold
 Harold, Florida, an unincorporated community 
 Harold, Kentucky,  an unincorporated community 
 Harold, Missouri, an unincorporated community

Elsewhere
 Harold, Ontario, Canada, a community in Stirling-Rawdon township

Other uses 
 Cyclone Harold
 Harold (horse), an American Thoroughbred racehorse
 Harold (improvisation), an improvisational form popularized by Del Close
 Harold Interlocking, a rail junction in New York City

See also 
 Harald (disambiguation) 
 Harrold (disambiguation)
 Herald (disambiguation)
 Jesus H. Christ (folk paretymology)